Michael Sugar is an American film and television producer and principal at Sugar23, best known for producing Spotlight, 13 Reasons Why, Maniac and  The Knick.

Life and career 
Sugar attended the Armand Hammer United World College of the American West in New Mexico after which he completed his undergraduate studies in 1995 at Brandeis University. He went on to study law at Georgetown University. He is the son of the producer/distributor Larry Sugar and is married to Lauren Wall Sugar. He is Jewish.

Sugar's list of literary and talent clients includes Steven Soderbergh, Richard Linklater, Cary Fukunaga, Edgar Wright, Marc Webb, Patty Jenkins and Robin Wright.

He was previously an executive producer of Cinemax’s critically acclaimed drama series The Knick, starring Clive Owen and directed by Steven Soderbergh. He is currently an executive producer of the Netflix series, The OA (co-created by Zal Batmanglij client Brit Marling, who also stars), Maniac (starring Emma Stone and Jonah Hill, and directed by client Cary Fukunaga) and 13 Reasons Why (starring Dylan Minnette and Katherine Langford).

On the film side, Sugar won an Academy Award for Best Picture as producer of Spotlight (2015), starring Mark Ruffalo, Michael Keaton and Rachel McAdams. Through his Sugar23 banner, he is actively producing a lengthy development slate, including projects from clients Soderbergh, Cary Fukunaga and Patty Jenkins.

Sugar is a member of the Academy of Television Arts and Sciences and lectures regularly at USC, NYU, Columbia and the American Film Institute. He has been nominated for an Emmy Award, and in 2014 he won a Peabody Award for The Knick.

Filmography 
 2002: WinTuition (TV series, executive producer)
 2004: A Separate Peace (TV movie, executive producer)
 2007: Rendition (executive producer)
 2011: Restless (executive producer)
 2012: Big Miracle (producer)
 2012: Transit (Short, executive producer)
 2013: Stroumboulopoulos (TV series, executive producer)
 2013: The Fifth Estate (producer)
 2014: The Knick (TV series, executive producer)
 2014: The Keeping Room (executive producer)
 2015: Spotlight (producer)
 2016: The OA (TV series, executive producer)
 2016: Collateral Beauty (producer)
 2017: 13 Reasons Why (TV series, executive producer)
 2018: Maniac (executive producer)
 2019: The Report (producer)
 2019: The Laundromat (producer)
 2020: Worth (producer)

References

External links 
 

Living people
American television producers
American film producers
American Jews
Georgetown University Law Center alumni
Producers who won the Best Picture Academy Award
Year of birth missing (living people)